Robert Wesley Brooke (born December 18, 1960) is an American former professional ice hockey forward who played 447 games in the National Hockey League (NHL) with the New York Rangers, Minnesota North Stars, and New Jersey Devils between 1984 and 1990. Internationally Brooke played for the American national team at several tournaments, including the 1984 Winter Olympics and the 1984 and 1987 Canada Cups, as well as three World Championships.

Playing career
Brooke was the first of the "AB Pros," the handful of NHL players that grew up through the Acton-Boxborough youth hockey program of the 1960s, 1970s, and 1980s (Tom Barrasso, Ted Crowley, Bob Sweeney, Ian Moran, and Jeff Norton). He graduated from Acton-Boxborough Regional High School in 1979. After graduation, Brooke played for the Yale University men's ice hockey team graduating in 1983. He played international hockey as a member of the United States national team at the 1984 Winter Olympics in Sarajevo. He also played baseball for Yale alongside future New York Mets' pitcher Ron Darling.

In the NHL, he played for the New York Rangers, Minnesota North Stars and New Jersey Devils. After joining the NHL, he also played for US team in the 1984 Canada Cup, 1985 and 1987 Ice Hockey World Championships as well as the 1987 Canada Cup.

Career statistics

Regular season and playoffs

International

Awards and honors

References

External links
 
 Brooke's profile @ hockeydraftcentral.com

1960 births
Living people
AHCA Division I men's ice hockey All-Americans
American men's ice hockey centers
Ice hockey players from Massachusetts
Ice hockey players at the 1984 Winter Olympics
Minnesota North Stars players
New York Rangers players
New Jersey Devils players
Olympic ice hockey players of the United States
People from Acton, Massachusetts
People from Melrose, Massachusetts
Sportspeople from Middlesex County, Massachusetts
St. Louis Blues draft picks
Yale Bulldogs men's ice hockey players